In mathematics, a remarkable cardinal is a certain kind of large cardinal number.

A cardinal κ is called remarkable if for all regular cardinals θ > κ, there exist π, M, λ, σ, N and ρ such that

 π : M → Hθ is an elementary embedding
 M is countable and transitive
 π(λ) = κ
 σ : M → N is an elementary embedding with critical point λ
 N is countable and transitive
 ρ = M ∩ Ord is a regular cardinal in N
 σ(λ) > ρ
 M = HρN, i.e., M ∈ N and N ⊨ "M is the set of all sets that are hereditarily smaller than ρ"

Equivalently,  is remarkable if and only if for every  there is  such that in some forcing extension , there is an elementary embedding  satisfying .

See also
Hereditarily countable set

References

Large cardinals